Babaylu (also Romanized as Bābāylū) is a village in Mulan Rural District, in the Central District of Kaleybar County, East Azerbaijan Province, Iran. At the 2006 census, its population was 61, in 15 families.

References 

Populated places in Kaleybar County